Begonia adamsensis is an endemic species of Begonia discovered in Adams, Ilocos Norte province, Luzon, Philippines occurring at an altitude of 308 m above sea level. The species broad-based leaves that are peltate, with a glabrous peduncle, an acuminate tip and nearly entire margin, resembled that of Begonia hernandioides. However, there are differences, in that B. hernandioides had red-colored stipule that is broadly ovate, the petiole and abaxial lamina is pubescent, and the peltate leaves are elliptic.

Etymology
The specific epithet refers to the name of the municipality of Adams, where the species was first documented.

References

External links
Begonia adamsensis (Sect. Baryandra, Begoniaceae), a new species from Luzon Island, the Philippines 
Begonia adamsensis (Sect. Baryandra, Begoniaceae), a new species from Luzon Island, the Philippines 
Begoniaceae

adamsensis
Endemic flora of the Philippines